Commando: A One Man Army is a 2013 Indian Hindi-language action thriller film directed by Dilip Ghosh and produced by Vipul Amrutlal Shah and Reliance Entertainment. It is the first installment of Commando film series. The film features Vidyut Jammwal, Pooja Chopra and Jaideep Ahlawat in the lead roles. Jammwal, who is trained in the Indian martial arts of Kalaripayattu, performs his own stunts and martial arts in the film's action sequences.

The film revolves around Karan, an Indian Para SF Captain who escaped from Chinese custody, runs into a woman named Simrit, who is being chased by a gangster named AK-74 and his goons. Learning that AK-74 is hellbent on forcibly marrying Simrit for political gain, Karan intervenes and protects her as they are pursued deeper into the woods where Karan uses his martial arts combat skills to fight off AK-74's henchmen.

The film was released theatrically on 12 April 2013. It was followed by two sequels, Commando 2: The Black Money Trail in 2017 and Commando 3 in 2019.

Plot
Para SF Captain Karan Singh Dogra is captured by Chinese officials when his helicopter crashes on the Chinese border during a routine training exercise. Karan and his seniors are unable to convince the Chinese of the former's innocence. The Chinese decide to brand Karan as a spy to defame India internationally. Feeling the Chinese won't comply, the Indian government order the Indian Army to erase Karan's record, identity and deny his existence. Karan is tortured for a year by the Chinese Army but later escapes while being taken to the Chinese Military Court. He runs into a woman named Simrit, who is running away from dreaded gangster Amrit Kanwal "AK-74" Singh and his goons. Karan rescues her by fighting off the goons headed by AK-74's politician brother. He decides to escort Simrit out of the town for her safety but finds himself surrounded by AK-74 and his goons at a bridge. Outnumbered and outgunned, he jumps into the river along with Simrit who later explains that AK-74 wants to marry her for political gains. 

Simrit reveals that AK-74 has total control over her home town, where he rules with an iron fist through fear. Karan decides to help Simrit. AK-74 uses his resources to pursue the duo into the jungle, where Karan uses his expertise in jungle warfare to fight AK-74's men. However, after a long chase, Karan is caught by AK-74, who shoots him and throws him down a cliff. He then kills Simrit's parents as a warning to her. Karan, having survived the fall, goes after AK-74. After combating his henchmen and also an assassin named Theba sent by the Chinese, Karan defeats AK-74 and rescues Simrit. Karan takes the captured AK-74 to the town square, where he is almost foiled by the police who are in AK-74's pocket, but is saved in time by his ex superior officer, Col Akhilesh Sinha. Karan proceeds to hang and kill AK-74. Karan then asks the town folk to be fearless and not be afraid of people like AK-74, who rule through fear. Karan surrenders himself to Col Sinha, where he tells his real name to Simrit, and promises to be back.

Cast
 Vidyut Jamwal as Captain Karanveer "Karan" Singh Dogra, Para SF
 Pooja Chopra as Simrit Kaur 
 Jaideep Ahlawat as Amrit 'AK-47' Kanwal, a dreaded gangster
 Jagat Rawat as MP Mahendra Pratap
 Darshan Jariwala as Col. Akhilesh Sinha, Karan's Commanding officer
 Baljinder Kaur
 Nathan Barris as Theba, an assassin

Soundtrack
The soundtrack album of Commando was released on 28 March 2013 as a digital download on popular digital music platforms, iTunes and Amazon. It contains 5 original tracks. The music was composed by Mannan Shaah, with lyrics penned by Mayur Puri, while the background score has been scored by Prasad Sasthe.

Release

Critical reception
Upon release, Commando garnered mixed to positive reviews from critics. At Reviewbol.com, it got an average review score of 3/5 from major sites. Taran Adarsh of Bollywood Hungama gave Commando 3.5 out of 5 stars and said "A high-voltage action fare that's racy, pulsating and packed with some adrenaline-pumping stunts". Meena Iyer of The Times of India rated it with 3.5 out of 5 star while remarking "For the first time in eons, the action scenes are totally convincing". Shubhra Gupta of Indian Express awarded it 3.5 out of 5, noting," That an action film should have no place for song and dance is a no-brainer. It also has a story that creaks. Minus these irritants, it would have been a pure adrenaline rush". Saibal Chatterjee of NDTV gave it 2 out of 5 while commenting "Despite all the bravura technical effort that has clearly been put into Commando, the end result simply isn't compelling enough". Alisha Coelho of in.com gave the movie 2.5 stars, saying "Commando – A One Man Army is a one man show where Vidyut carries the entire weight on his shoulders."

Boxoffice
The film raked  over its first weekend. At its first week, it netted around  having decent business in single screens.

Alternate version
Nameless Media, the film's German distributor, released four limited edition media books in August 2019 that contained a Full Action Version apart from the original uncut version. In this alternate cut, the songs and intermission card have been removed.

Sequel
Following the film's success, it received two sequels. The first one titled Commando 2 was released in 2017, while Commando 3 released in 2019.

References

External links

 

2010s Hindi-language films
2013 films
2013 action thriller films
Films scored by Mannan Shaah
2010s chase films
Indian action thriller films
Indian chase films
Indian martial arts films
Films shot in Mumbai
Films shot in Punjab, India
Kalarippayattu films
Films with screenplays by Ritesh Shah
Reliance Entertainment films
2013 martial arts films